The 2014–15 season was Partick Thistle's second consecutive season in the Scottish Premiership and their second season back in the top-flight of Scottish football, having been promoted from the First Division at the end of the 2012–13 season. Thistle also competed in the League Cup and the Scottish Cup.

Summary

Season

Partick Thistle finished in eighth place in the Scottish Premiership with 46 points, they also reached quarter-final of the League Cup and the fifth round of the Scottish Cup.

Results and fixtures

Pre Season

Scottish Premiership

Scottish League Cup

Scottish Cup

Player statistics

|-
|colspan="12"|Players who left the club during the 2014–15 season
|-

|}

Team Statistics

League table

Division summary

References

Partick Thistle F.C. seasons
Partick Thistle